Basket Azuqueca, also known as Isover Basket Azuqueca for sponsorship reasons, is a professional basketball club based in Azuqueca de Henares, Castile-La Mancha, that currently plays in LEB Plata, the third tier of Spanish basketball.

History
Basket Azuqueca was founded on 11 December 1997 after the dissolution of former CB Azuqueca, that played in the second tier during the 1991–92 season, and as a merge of the two local clubs: Baloncesto Azuqueca and Construcciones Diego Velásquez.

In 2004, the club achieved promotion to Primera División after only losing two games in all the season. Three years later, Azuqueca was close to promote to Liga EBA after finishing the season in the fifth place. After several seasons being close to promote, they finally achieved that goal in 2011 in a promotion stage played in Madrid.

Basket Azuqueca remained narrowly during their first seasons in the league and in 2014 was close to be folded, but finally people of the club took the helm to avoid a new dissolution.

In 2018, after failing in the promotion playoffs, Azuqueca achieved a vacant place in LEB Plata, third division, due to its expansion to 24 teams.

Players

Current roster

Depth chart

Season by season

Notable players
To appear in this section a player must have either:
- Set a club record or won an individual award as a professional player.
- Played at least one official international match for his senior national team at any time.
 Gullit Mukendi
 Phil Henry

References

External links
Official website 

Basketball teams in Castilla–La Mancha
Basketball teams established in 1997
1997 establishments in Spain
Former Liga EBA teams
LEB Plata teams
Province of Guadalajara